The third and final season of Laguna Beach: The Real Orange County, an American reality television series, consists of 16 episodes and was broadcast on MTV. It aired from August 16, 2006, until November 15, 2006. The season was filmed from December 2005 to August 2006, primarily in Laguna Beach, California, with additional footage in Los Angeles. The executive producer was Tony DiSanto.

Laguna Beach focuses on the lives of rich teenagers from Laguna Beach, California. The teens attend Laguna Beach High School. Cameron is the bad boy that always gets what he wants, and Chase is trying to balance his school life along with his music career. Tessa wants to be a priority to Chase but he is so caught up in his own life to notice her.

Synopsis
Season 3 began filming after the original cast left to pursue opportunities at college and focuses on Tessa and her best friend, Raquel. During her time in Laguna Beach, Tessa spends her days balancing her social life while attending Laguna beach High school. Tessa attends her Ex-bestfriend Kyndra's BBQ after she receives a text message from her. However, the event was short lived  due to Kyndra/Cami and their friends making them feel unwelcome. Meanwhile, Tessa began a short relationship with Cameron Brinkman and an on-off relationship between Derek LeBon. Raquel began dating Alex Atkinson, which became a main storyline throughout the series along with her trying to reconcile with her ex-bestfriend Breanna Conrad In the season finale, the Seniors Alex/Derek/Kelan And Chase are shown moving on to college and the Juniors Tessa/Raquel/Lexie/Cami/Kyndra/Breanna Become Seniors.

Episodes

2006 American television seasons